Daniel Bernhardt (born 11 April 1996) is a Swedish professional ice hockey forward. He is currently an unrestricted free agent who most recently played with BIK Karlskoga of the HockeyAllsvenskan (Allsv). Bernhardt was selected by the New York Rangers in the 4th round (119th overall) of the 2015 NHL Entry Draft.

Bernhardt made his Swedish Hockey League debut playing with Djurgårdens IF during the 2014–15 SHL season. His younger brother, David remains playing in the SHL with the Växjö Lakers.

Career statistics

References

External links

1996 births
Living people
Almtuna IS players
Bofors IK players
Djurgårdens IF Hockey players
London Knights players
New York Rangers draft picks
Swedish ice hockey forwards
VIK Västerås HK players